Kingsteps is a hamlet in Nairnshire about a mile east-north-east of Nairn, UK. It faces north to a wide sandy beach at low tide.

See also 
Culbin Forest – A forest in Moray, near Kingsteps.

References 

Populated places in the County of Nairn